Mikael Lidhammar (born October 28, 1987, in Luleå, Sweden) is a professional Swedish ice hockey winger currently playing with Bodens HF in the Swedish Hockeyettan. Lidhammar previously played for the Dundee Stars, Guildford Flames, ASC Corona Brasov and Glasgow Clan.

References

External links

1987 births
Dundee Stars players
Guildford Flames players
Glasgow Clan players
IK Oskarshamn players
Living people
Luleå HF players
People from Luleå
Swedish ice hockey left wingers
Sportspeople from Norrbotten County
Swedish expatriate ice hockey people
Swedish expatriate sportspeople in Scotland
Swedish expatriate sportspeople in England
Swedish expatriate ice hockey people in Romania
Expatriate ice hockey players in Scotland
Expatriate ice hockey players in England